Vincent Thomas Keaveny (born 1 July 1965 at Dublin) is an Irish commercial lawyer, who served as the 693rd Lord Mayor of London for 2021–22.

Biography
Educated at St Michael's College, University College Dublin, and Trinity College Dublin, since 1989 Keaveny has lived and worked in England, qualifying as a solicitor in 1992. He took the degree of Bachelor of Civil Law from University College Dublin in 1986, and has been a partner in DLA Piper since 2015.

Keaveny serves as Alderman for the Ward of Farringdon Within since 2013, and served as a Sheriff of the City of London for 2018–19. He is a liveryman of the City of London Solicitors' Company, the Worshipful Company of Woolmen, the Distillers, the Spectacle Makers, the Stationers and Newspaper Makers, the Framework Knitters, the Upholders, and the Security Professionals.

In 2018 Keaveny was awarded the UCD Alumni Award in Law.

Elected Lord Mayor of London, Keaveny took office on 13 November 2021, being appointed KStJ.

Alderman Nicholas Lyons succeeded him as Lord Mayor on 11 November 2022.

Vincent Keaveny is a Member of the Order of the Holy Sepulchre.

References

External links
 Keaveny's personal Website

1965 births
Living people
People educated at St Michael's College, Dublin
Alumni of University College Dublin
Alumni of Trinity College Dublin
Lawyers from Dublin (city)
Councilmen and Aldermen of the City of London
Sheriffs of the City of London
Knights of the Order of Saint John (chartered 1888)
21st-century lord mayors of London